Barakesse is a village in the rural commune of Kataba I, in the Bignona Department of the Ziguinchor Region of south-western Senegal. In 2002 it had a population of 385 people.

References

Populated places in the Bignona Department